Num Ri is a mountain in the Khumbu region of the Nepalese Himalayas. Num Ri consists of a long ridge that culminates eastwards in a pyramid summit. Neighbouring mountains are Island Peak, Baruntse and Cho Polu.

Num Ri was first climbed on November 7, 2002 by the German climbers Olaf Rieck, Lydia Schubert and Carsten Schmidt.

References

External links
 Expedition Website (in German)

Six-thousanders of the Himalayas
Solukhumbu District
Mountains of Koshi Province